The Little River is a river that runs through the towns of Hampton, Canterbury, Scotland, and Sprague, Connecticut. It begins at Hampton Reservoir in northern Hampton, CT and snakes its way down into the Shetucket River at the town borders of Norwich, Sprague, and Lisbon, CT

Crossings 
Whole River is in Connecticut

References

Rivers of Windham County, Connecticut
Rivers of New London County, Connecticut
Rivers of Connecticut
Tributaries of the Thames River (Connecticut)
Hampton, Connecticut
Scotland, Connecticut
Canterbury, Connecticut
Sprague, Connecticut
Norwich, Connecticut